Miss USA is an American beauty pageant that has been held annually since 1952 to select the entrant from United States in the Miss Universe pageant. The Miss Universe Organization operated both pageants, as well as Miss Teen USA, until 2020, when the organization announced it was licensing operation of the Miss USA and Miss Teen USA pageants to Crystle Stewart, Miss USA for 2008.

The pageant was owned by Donald Trump from 1996 to 2015 and was previously broadcast on NBC. In September 2015, WME/IMG purchased the pageant from Trump. In 2020, for the first time, the FYI network broadcast the competition. In October 2022, JKN Global Group acquired the pageant from WME/IMG.

The current Miss USA is Morgan Romano of North Carolina, who was crowned on January 27, 2023, at Gogue Performing Arts Center in Auburn, Alabama during the Miss Alabama USA 2023 preliminary competition. She took over the title from R'Bonney Gabriel after winning the Miss Universe 2022 pageant.

History
The Miss USA pageant was conceived in 1950 when Yolande Betbeze, winner of the Miss America pageant, refused to pose for publicity pictures while wearing a swimsuit. Pageant sponsor Catalina decided to pull their sponsorship of the pageant and create their own competition. Other owners have included a subsidiary of Gulf+Western Industries, ITT Corporation, and Donald Trump.

The first Miss USA and Miss Universe pageants were held concurrently in Long Beach, California in 1952; the first Miss USA winner was Miss New York USA Jackie Loughery. There were 30 delegates in the first year of competition. Many states did not compete every year during the first two decades of the pageant's history. Since the 1970s, each state and the District of Columbia have sent a delegate each year. Alaska first competed in 1959 and Hawaii in 1960. Both had competed at Miss Universe until this time.

The pageant aired on CBS from 1963 until 2002, and for many years was known for having a CBS game show host as pageant host. John Charles Daly hosted the show from 1963 to 1966, Bob Barker from 1967 (he was not a regular for the CBS network until 1972 when he became the host of The Price Is Right which he hosted until 2007) until 1987 (at which point Barker, a lifelong vegan, quit in a dispute over fur coats), Alan Thicke in 1988, Dick Clark from 1989 to 1993, and Bob Goen from 1994 to 1996. The show's highest ratings were in the early 1980s when it regularly topped the Nielsen ratings. Viewership dropped sharply from the 1990s to the 2000s, from an estimated viewership of 20 million to an average of 7 million from 2000 to 2001. In 2002, owner Donald Trump brokered a new deal with NBC, giving them half-ownership of the Miss USA, Miss Universe, and Miss Teen USA and moving them to NBC on an initial five-year contract. The pageants were first shown on NBC in 2003.

The Miss USA title winner historically represented the U.S. in its sister pageant, Miss Universe. Since its inception, nine Miss USA titleholders have gone on to win Miss Universe. In the mid-1960s, the organization established a rule that when a Miss USA wins the Miss Universe title, the first runner-up assumes the Miss USA title for the remainder of the year. This occurred in 1980, 1995, 1997, 2012, and 2022. In 1967, the first runner-up Susan Bradley of California declined the title and the crown went to the second runner-up Cheryl Patton of Florida. The only instance when a first runner-up assumed the title of Miss USA before this period was in 1957, when Mary Leona Gage of Maryland resigned after it was discovered she was married.

The winner is assigned a one-year contract with the Miss Universe Organization, traveling across the United States and sometimes overseas to spread messages about their chosen causes. Aside from the job, the winner also receives a cash allowance for her entire reign, a modeling portfolio, beauty products, clothes, shoes, styling, healthcare, and fitness services from different pageant sponsors. She also gains exclusive access to events such as fashion shows and opening galas, as well as access to casting calls and modeling opportunities throughout New York City. When Donald Trump owned the pageant, the winner was given the use of a Trump Place apartment in New York City during her reign, which she shared with the Miss Universe and Miss Teen USA titleholders. 

If the winner cannot fulfill her duties as Miss USA for any reason, including if she wins the Miss Universe title, her 1st runner-up takes over.

After losing its television partners, it was announced that Miss USA 2015 would be streamed on the pageant's website. Shortly before the pageant, Reelz Channel announced that it would broadcast Miss USA 2015.

In September 2015, IMG bought the Miss Universe Organization for an undisclosed amount. The company had previously been involved in licensing and production for the events. The following month, Fox announced that it had acquired the U.S. television rights to Miss USA and Miss Universe beginning with Miss Universe 2015 and Miss USA 2016.

In October 2022, JKN Global Group through JKN Metaverse Inc. acquired the Miss Universe Organization for US$14 million.

Miss USA 2015 Controversy

In late-June 2015, both NBC and Spanish-language network Univision (which was to begin a new five-year contract for Spanish rights) announced that they would cut their ties with Donald Trump and the Miss Universe Organization in response to remarks Trump made relating to undocumented immigrants during the launch of his 2016 U.S. presidential campaign. Trump threatened to sue both companies over the decision; on June 30, 2015, Trump sued Univision for defamation and breach of contract. In February 2016, Donald Trump and Univision reached a settlement ending the litigation. The terms of the settlement remain confidential but included an agreement for Trump to buy back NBCUniversal's stake in the MUO.

Response to COVID-19 pandemic
The Miss USA 2020 pageant had always usually in the spring or summer schedule, and numerous scheduling delays had impacted it, lacked finding a location, and broadcasting issues amid the ongoing COVID-19 pandemic in the United States, it would be televised at FYI and the first pageant to be held in fall, in November.

2020–2022: Split from MUO
In the summer of 2020, the Miss Universe organization finalized licensing of future annual operation of the Miss USA and Miss Teen USA pageants to Crystle Stewart, who was Miss USA 2008. The first pageant competitions under her directorship as Miss USA Organization were the 2021 productions.

2022-present: Miss USA 2022 Controversy and MUO Investigation 
Shortly after the Miss USA 2022 competition, the Miss Universe Organization suspended the organizers of the Miss USA pageant (headed by Crystle Stewart) after allegations of favoritism toward the eventual winner, R'Bonney Gabriel, while she was still Miss Texas USA. The investigation is ongoing.

Competition
The modern pageant consists of a preliminary competition held a week before the pageant when all contestants are judged in swimsuit, evening gown, and interview competitions.

State competitions

Every year, applicants must have to choose their delegate for the Miss USA pageant between the ages of above 18 and below 28 on the annual state pageant season. Each state holds a preliminary competition. In some states (such as Texas and Florida), local pageants are also held to determine delegates for the state competition. The state winners hold the title "Miss (State) USA" for the year of their reign.

The most successful state is Texas; nine Texas representatives have gone on to win the Miss USA title, more than any other state, including five consecutive winners from 1985 until 1989. California has the second most wins at six, while the District of Columbia, New York, Hawaii, and Illinois each have four.

Miss USA licenses out the state pageants to pageant directors, who in some cases are responsible for more than one state. The directorial groups are the following: 
RPM Productions (Alabama, Louisiana, North Carolina, South Carolina)
Vanbros and Associates (Arkansas, Illinois, Kansas, Missouri, Nebraska, Oklahoma)
Future Productions (Colorado, Iowa, Minnesota, North Dakota, South Dakota, Wisconsin, Wyoming)
Pageant Associates (West Virginia)
Pageants NW Productions (Idaho, Oregon, Washington)
The Pageant Guy Productions (Texas)
Greenwood Productions (Georgia, Mississippi, Tennessee)
D&D Productions (Maryland, New Jersey, New York, Rhode Island)
Proctor Productions (Kentucky, Michigan, Ohio, Pennsylvania)
Casting Crown Productions (Arizona)
Smoak Productions (Nevada, Utah)
Nice & Wonderful Productions (Virginia)
The Clemente Organization (Maine, Massachusetts)
Garness Productions (Alaska)
New Media Productions (Hawaii)
V&M Productions, LLC (Delaware)
Laura's Productions (New Mexico)
Ewald Productions (Connecticut)
GDB Theatre and Pageant Productions (New Hampshire, Vermont)
Crown Moxie (Indiana)
Girlbossing Inc. (Florida)
Crown Diva Productions (California)
Brains and Beauties Productions (District of Columbia)
Lime Light Enterprises (Montana)

Winners
Miss USA 2015, Olivia Jordan, of Oklahoma is the only Miss USA winner to compete in two major international pageants: Miss Universe and Miss World. The tallest Miss USA is Miss USA 2012, Nana Meriwether, of Maryland at 6 feet and 0 inch (183 cm).

The first Asian-American woman to win Miss USA was Macel Wilson of Hawaii in 1962; the first Hispanic woman was Laura Martinez-Herring of Texas in 1985; the first African-American winner was Carole Gist of Michigan in 1990; the first Pacific Islander American Miss USA was Brook Lee of Hawaii in 1997; and the first Middle Eastern American Miss USA was Rima Fakih of Michigan in 2010. 

Though no woman has ever won both titles outright, Brandi Sherwood of Idaho is the only woman to have held both the Miss Teen USA and Miss USA titles. She was Miss Idaho Teen USA, Miss Teen USA 1989, Miss Idaho USA 1997, first runner-up at Miss USA 1997, and in May 1997 assumed the Miss USA title after Brook Lee of Hawaii won the Miss Universe pageant. Ten other Miss USA titleholders have also previously competed at Miss Teen USA. These include:

Shanna Moakler (1995, Miss Rhode Island Teen USA 1992)
Ali Landry (1996, Miss Louisiana Teen USA 1990)
Kimberly Pressler (1999, Miss New York Teen USA 1994)
Lynnette Cole (2000, Miss Tennessee Teen USA 1995)
Susie Castillo (2003, Miss Massachusetts Teen USA 1998)
Chelsea Cooley (2005, Miss North Carolina Teen USA 2000)
Tara Conner (2006, Miss Kentucky Teen USA 2002)
Rachel Smith (2007, Miss Tennessee Teen USA 2002)
Alyssa Campanella (2011, Miss New Jersey Teen USA 2007)
Sarah Rose Summers (2018, Miss Nebraska Teen USA 2012)

Six Miss USA titleholders have also competed at Miss America. These include:
Miriam Stevenson (1954, Miss South Carolina 1953)
Carlene King Johnson (1955, Miss Vermont 1953)
Carol Morris (1956, Miss Iowa 1954)
Mai Shanley (1984, Miss New Mexico 1983)
Shandi Finnessey (2004, Miss Missouri 2002)
Asya Branch (2020, Miss Mississippi 2018)

Shandi Finnessey, Miss USA 2004 and Miss Missouri 2002 won a preliminary evening gown award at Miss America 2003. Also, Miriam Stevenson placed in the top 10 at Miss America 1954 as Miss South Carolina 1953.

Many Miss USA winners have gone to pursue careers in the entertainment industry. Those who have been successful in the industry include Summer Bartholomew, Deborah Shelton, Laura Martinez-Herring, Kelli McCarty, Shanna Moakler, Frances Parker, Ali Landry, Kenya Moore, Brandi Sherwood, Kimberly Pressler, Susie Castillo, Shandi Finnessey, Rachel Smith, Crystle Stewart, and Cheslie Kryst.

Miss USA titleholders

Awards
The awards most frequently presented at Miss USA are Miss Amity (also known as Miss Congeniality) and Miss Photogenic.

The Miss Amity Award is chosen by the delegates, and recognizes those who are the friendliest and make the pageant experience the most enjoyable. From 1952 to 1964, when the Miss USA and Miss Universe pageants were concurrent events, the award could be won by a contestant competing either for Miss USA or Miss Universe. In fact, in 1960, there was a tie, with the award going to Miss Universe Burma, Myint Myint May, and Miss Louisiana USA, Rebecca Fletcher. In 2015, Alaska and Delaware tied for the Miss Congeniality award. Vermont and Wyoming have won five Miss Amity/Congeniality awards, two more than any other state.

The Miss Photogenic prize was first awarded in 1965 and was chosen by journalists until 1996 when it was chosen by an internet vote for the first time. There has been only one tie in this award's history: in 1980, when it was shared between Jineane Ford of Arizona and Elizabeth Kim Thomas of Ohio. The state that has won the most Photogenic awards is Virginia.

Louisiana won both the first Miss Amity and Photogenic awards given to a Miss USA contestant.

Other awards that have been presented include Best State Costume (1962–1993, 2021–present), Style (1995–2001) and Most Beautiful Eyes (1993). In 1998, a special Distinguished Achievement award was given to Halle Berry. Berry was Miss Ohio USA 1986 and placed 1st runner-up to Christy Fichtner of Texas. She later went on to become an acclaimed actress and Oscar winner.

Locations
In the first eight years of competition (1952–1959), the Miss USA pageant was held in Long Beach, California. The competition moved to Miami Beach, Florida in 1960 and stayed there until 1971. In 1972, the pageant was held in Puerto Rico, the only time the pageant has been held outside the continental United States. That pageant was rocked by an explosion at the host hotel.

From 1972 onwards, the pageant has been held in various locations, generally being held in each location for two to three years.

As of 2021, the pageant has been held in the following states:

Alabama
Mobile (1989)
California
Long Beach (1952–1959)
Los Angeles (2004, 2007) 
Florida
Miami Beach (1960–1971)
Lakeland (1984–1985)
Miami (1986)
Indiana
Gary (2001–2002)
Kansas
Wichita (1990–1993)
Louisiana
Shreveport (1997–1998, 2018)
Baton Rouge (2014–2015)
Maryland
Baltimore (2005–2006)
Missouri
Branson (1999–2000)
Mississippi
Biloxi (1979–1982)
Nevada
Las Vegas (2008–2013, 2016–2017)
Reno (2019, 2022)
New Mexico
Albuquerque (1987)
New York
New York City (1973)
Niagara Falls (1974–1976)
Oklahoma
Tulsa (2021)
South Carolina
Charleston (1977–1978)
Tennessee
Knoxville (1983)
Memphis (2020)
Texas
El Paso (1988)
South Padre Island (1994–1996)
San Antonio (2003)

Special feature episodes

Since 2003, a number of delegates have been involved in special episodes of regular programs broadcast by NBC. From 2003 to 2005, six delegates each year were chosen to participate in a special Miss USA edition of Fear Factor, with the victorious contestant taking the title "Miss Fear Factor USA" and a prize of $50,000 ($25,000 of which was to be donated to a charity of the winner's choice). These were broadcast immediately prior to the live pageant broadcast.

In 2006, Chelsea Cooley and twenty-six delegates participated as briefcase models in a Miss USA special of Deal or No Deal.

In 2010, ten Miss USA and Miss Universe winners competed for charity on a special "Last Beauty Standing" edition of Minute to Win It.

Reality television
Many Miss USA and Miss Teen USA delegates have participated in reality television shows and other television game shows. Well known delegates who later competed in reality shows are Danni Boatwright, winner of Survivor: Guatemala and contestant of Survivor: Winners at War, Kim Mullen of Survivor: Palau; Amanda Kimmel of Survivor: China, Survivor: Micronesia and Survivor: Heroes vs. Villains; Candace Smith of Survivor: Tocantins; Ashley Underwood of Survivor: Redemption Island, and Desiree Williams of Survivor: Heroes vs. Healers vs. Hustlers; Christie Lee Woods of The Amazing Race 5 and The Amazing Race 31, Nicole O'Brian also of The Amazing Race 5, Stephanie Smith of The Amazing Race 17 and Amy Diaz of The Amazing Race 23; Shandi Finnessey, Shanna Moakler and Hannah Brown on Dancing with the Stars; Jennifer Murphy of The Apprentice 4; Tori Fiorenza of The Challenge: Cutthroat; Brown also appeared in The Bachelor and The Bachelorette, other The Bachelor stars include Krisily Kennedy, Catherine Warren, Caroline Lunny, Caelynn Miller-Keyes, Alayah Benavidez, Kelsey Weier, Victoria Paul, Mariela Pepin, and Susie Evans.

In 2007, Pageant Place, a reality television show featuring Rachel Smith, Riyo Mori, Hilary Cruz, Katie Blair, and Tara Conner aired on MTV.

On June 19, 2011, Bravo Television's Andy Cohen co-hosted the event's 60th anniversary live in Las Vegas with E! News and Fashion Police's Giuliana Rancic. They also hosted the 2012 pageant.

See also
 Miss Grand USA
 Miss U.S. International
 United States representatives at Miss World
 Miss Earth United States
 Miss Teen USA
 Miss America

References

External links

 

 
1952 establishments in California
American awards
USA
CBS original programming
Miss Universe Organization
NBC original programming
Recurring events established in 1952
USA